Break of Hearts is the fifth studio album by rock band Katrina and the Waves, released in 1989 (see 1989 in music). It is their last album to reach the Billboard 200, reaching #122, and contains their last top 40 hit in the United States, "That's the Way", which reached #16. It was their last studio album released in the United States and the first and only release for the SBK label (the band would briefly move to Virgin Records just before it was sold to Capitol's then-owner EMI).

Background and critical reception
After being dropped by Capitol Records following 1986's Waves album, Katrina and the Waves secured a new deal with SBK Records, which released the more rock-oriented Break of Hearts. Despite a US Top 20 hit with "That's the Way", it was their only album for the label. Singer Katrina Leskanich said on the band's website, "SBK told us that they could see us as a stadium band, Bryan Adams style, and [guitarist Kimberley Rew] was coming up with this stuff that was perfect for rock radio." Retrospective reviews were less than positive. Trouser Press described the album as a "horrendously wrongheaded comeback bid that shows the Waves to be utterly oblivious to their own strengths," calling it "bland, overprocessed commercial slop." The Rolling Stone Album Guide felt that the writing was "empty and mannered." Rew was quoted on the website saying, "We've never been successful enough to be immune from the influences of producers and marketing men ... the more we fell for those 80s trademarks, the more we diluted the band."

Track listing

Personnel
Credits adapted from the album's liner notes.

Katrina and the Waves
Katrina Leskanich – vocals, rhythm guitar
Kimberley Rew – lead guitar, vocals, keyboards
Vince de la Cruz – bass, additional guitars, vocals, keyboards
Alex Cooper – drums, vocals, keyboards
Additional musicians
Nick Glennie-Smith – additional keyboards
Stevie Lange – backing vocals
Shirley Lewis – backing vocals
Dee Lewis – backing vocals
Jimmy Helms – backing vocals
George Chandler – backing vocals
Jimmy Chambers – backing vocals
Technical
Katrina and the Waves – producer
Jay Burnett – additional production, engineer, mixing
Stephen Stewart – engineer  
Mark Sayer-Wade – engineer 
Mike Vindice – additional engineer 
Dennis Herman – additional engineer 
Pat Collier – additional engineer 
Sarah Jarman – assistant engineer 
Simon Lee – assistant engineer  
Vicente Roix – assistant engineer  
Nigel Green – mixing 
Paul Cox – front cover photography
Robin Emilien – back cover photography

Charts

Singles

Notes 

Katrina and the Waves albums
1989 albums
SBK Records albums
Attic Records albums